Massachusetts House of Representatives' 9th Suffolk district in the United States is one of 160 legislative districts included in the lower house of the Massachusetts General Court. It covers part of the city of Boston in Suffolk County. Democrat Jon Santiago of the South End has represented the district since 2019.

The current district geographic boundary overlaps with those of the Massachusetts Senate's 2nd Suffolk district and 2nd Suffolk and Middlesex district.

Representatives
 William Beck, circa 1858 
 Franklin H. Sprague, circa 1858 
 Thomas D. Morris, circa 1859 
 Alexander H. Twombly, circa 1859 
 Julius C. Chappelle, 1883-1886
 William O. Armstrong, circa 1888 
 Henry Parkman, circa 1888 
 William P. Hickey, circa 1920 
 William J. Manning, circa 1920 
 Laurence H. Banks, 1940s
 William A. Glynn, circa 1951

See also
 List of Massachusetts House of Representatives elections
 Other Suffolk County districts of the Massachusetts House of Representatives: 1st, 2nd, 3rd, 4th, 5th, 6th, 7th, 8th, 10th, 11th, 12th, 13th, 14th, 15th, 16th, 17th, 18th, 19th
 List of Massachusetts General Courts
 List of former districts of the Massachusetts House of Representatives

Images
Portraits of legislators

References

External links
 Ballotpedia
  (State House district information based on U.S. Census Bureau's American Community Survey).
 League of Women Voters of Boston

House
Government of Suffolk County, Massachusetts